Al-Jazāʾir may refer to
 Algeria
 Algiers